A foreign policy doctrine is a general statement of foreign policy and belief system through a doctrine. In some cases, the statement is made by a political leader, typically a nation’s chief executive or chief diplomat, and comes to be named after that leader. Richard Nixon’s justification for the phased withdrawal of the United States from the Vietnam War, for example, came to be called the Nixon Doctrine. This pattern of naming is not universal, however; Chinese doctrines, for example, are often referred to by number.

The purpose of a foreign policy doctrine is to provide general rules for the conduct of foreign policy through decisions on international relations.  These rules allow the political leadership of a nation to deal with a situation and to explain the actions of a nation to other nations. “Doctrine” is usually not meant to have any negative connotations; it is especially not to be confused with “dogma.”

Argentina 
 Calvo Doctrine
 Drago Doctrine

Denmark
 Ellemann–Jensen doctrine

Germany
 Hallstein Doctrine
 Ulbricht Doctrine

Finland
Paasikivi–Kekkonen doctrine

India
 Gujral Doctrine

Japan
 Fukuda Doctrine
 Yoshida Doctrine

Mexico
 Estrada Doctrine
 Castañeda Doctrine

Poland
 Giedroyc Doctrine

Russia / Soviet Union
 Brezhnev Doctrine
 Gerasimov Doctrine
 Karaganov Doctrine
 Falin-Kvitsinsky Doctrine
 Primakov Doctrine
 Sinatra Doctrine

United States
 1823: Monroe Doctrine
 1842: Tyler Doctrine
 1900: Roosevelt Doctrine
 1932: Stimson Doctrine
 1947: Truman Doctrine
 1957: Eisenhower Doctrine
 1961: Kennedy Doctrine
 1965: Johnson Doctrine
 1969: Nixon Doctrine
 1980: Carter Doctrine
 1981: Kirkpatrick Doctrine
 1984: Weinberger Doctrine
 1985: Reagan Doctrine
 1990: Powell Doctrine
 1999: Clinton Doctrine
 2002: Bush Doctrine
 2002: Rumsfeld Doctrine
 2016: Obama Doctrine

See also
 Military doctrine

Diplomacy